George White (20 September 1908 – 9 March 1966) was an Australian rules footballer who played with St Kilda in the Victorian Football League (VFL).

Notes

External links 

1908 births
1966 deaths
Australian rules footballers from Western Australia
St Kilda Football Club players
South Fremantle Football Club players